The triple whipple truss is a style of truss bridge that was used in the 19th century. In such a bridge, the diagonals are under tension. They cross two neighboring verticals rather than connecting to it like a Pratt truss.

The only remaining example of this style in the United States is the Laughery Creek Bridge in Indiana.

Truss bridges by type
Whipple truss bridges